The Carl Eduard War Cross was a military decoration of Saxe-Coburg and Gotha presented during World War I. Established 19 July 1916, by Charles Edward, Duke of Saxe-Coburg and Gotha, the cross recognized military merit and bravery in battle, without regard to rank. Awarded only 97 times, it is one of the rarest of World War I German military decorations. Recipients must have already been holders of the Iron Cross, 1st Class and been serving in the 6. Thüringischses Infanterie-Regiment Nr. 95.

Insignia
The Carl Eduard War Cross is in the shape of a Maltese cross, made of silver. On the obverse in the center medallion is the cypher CE surmounted by a ducal crown. The medallion is surrounded by a green enameled laurel wreath superimposed on the arms of the cross. The reverse of the medallion displays the Coat of arms of Saxe-Coburg and Gotha surrounded by the words FIDELITER ET CONSTANTER.

Notable recipients
Gotthard Heinrici
Paul von Hindenburg
Fritz von Selle

References

Orders, decorations, and medals of the Ernestine duchies
Awards established in 1916
1916 establishments in Germany